David Ferrer was the defending champion, but lost in the quarterfinals to Juan Martín del Potro.

Ninth-seeded Tomáš Berdych won in the final 6–1, 6–4, against Juan Martín del Potro.

Seeds
All seeds received a bye into the second round.

Draw

Finals

Top half

Section 1

Section 2

Bottom half

Section 3

Section 4

External links
Draw
Qualifying draw

Men's Singles
AIG Japan Open Tennis Championships